EQT AB Group is a global investment organization founded in 1994. Its funds invest in private equity, infrastructure, real estate, growth equity, and venture capital in Europe, North America, and Asia Pacific.

, EQT's assets under management are €210 billion / US$227 billion. It is ranked the third largest private equity firm worldwide based on funds raised.

History
The company was founded in 1994 by SEB, AEA Investors, and Investor AB. It established venture capital business, EQT Ventures in 2016 and went public in 2019 by IPO.

The firm and its associates have offices in Amsterdam, Copenhagen, Frankfurt, Guernsey, Helsinki, Hong Kong, London, Luxembourg, Madrid, Milan, Munich, New York, Oslo, Shanghai, Singapore, Stockholm, Warsaw and Zurich. 

In 2021, EQT acquired Life Sciences Partners, a European venture capital firm with approximately €2.2 billion of assets under management followed in 2022, by Baring Private Equity Asia managing funds of S$20.0 billion.

Fund investments

 2017, Medical device company Clinical Innovations from the Pritzker Group for US$250 million
 2019, SUSE for US$2.5 billion
 2019, Zayo Group Holding Inc from Digital Colony Partners for US$14.3 billion
 2019, Part of a consortium with ADIA to acquire Nestlé Skin Health
 2019, Acumatica
 2019, German fiber-optic network provider Inexio for $1.1 billion
 2020, Spanish real estate website Idealista for €1.3 billion
 2021, Announced plans to acquire solar and storage developer Cypress Creek Renewables

References

External links
 

Companies based in Stockholm
Companies related to the Wallenberg family
Financial services companies established in 1994
Private equity firms of Sweden
Swedish companies established in 1994